Jenna Hansen (born 25 October 1986) is a New Zealand competitive sailor. She competed at the 2012 Summer Olympics in London, in the women's Elliott 6m.

References

1986 births
Living people
New Zealand female sailors (sport)
Olympic sailors of New Zealand
Sailors at the 2012 Summer Olympics – Elliott 6m